"Dororo" and  are songs by Japanese rock band Asian Kung-Fu Generation. Both songs were released as a double A-side and become their 26th single on 15 May 2019. "Dororo" was used as second opening theme for 2019 remake anime, Dororo. "Kaihōku" was used as official support song of Fujieda MYFC and was broadcast at the stadium in a match against AC Nagano Parceiro. Prior to the single release, "Dororo" was available for digital download on iTunes.

Music video
The music video for "Dororo" was directed by Hiroteru Matsuda. The video presented in disturbing theme with a strange creature wanders inside building and Masafumi Gotoh sing with water effect in different scenes. The video itself is about "a strange creature that lives in a human heart".

The music video for "Kaihōku" was directed by Masaki Ōkita. They shot the music video on 23 April 2019 and recruited 200 fans as extras. The video starts with Gotoh sleeping on a moving couch, then waking up to sing the song. Other band members enter the building with many shoes and papers spread around. In a different scene, everyone looks sad and in despair. But during Gotoh's poetry, the door opens and they start to go out. The video ends with band and fans are singing together cheerfully and moving on.

Track listing

Personnel
Adapted from the album liner notes.

Asian Kung-Fu Generation
 Masafumi Gotoh – vocals, guitars, recording
 Kiyoshi Ijichi – drums, vocals
 Kensuke Kita – guitars, vocals
 Takahiro Yamada – bass guitar, vocals

Additional musicians
 Achico – vocals, (track 2)
 Yosuke Inomata – vocals (track 2)
 Ai Iwasaki – vocals (track 2)
 Makoto Komori – vocals (track 2)
 Ryosuke Shimomura – vocals (track 2)

Production
 Greg Calbi – mastering
 Kenichi Nakamura – recording, mixing

Artwork and design
 Yutaka Kimura – design
 Yusuke Nakamura – illustration

Charts

Dororo/Kaihōku

Dororo

Release history

References 

Asian Kung-Fu Generation songs
2019 singles
Songs written by Masafumi Gotoh
Songs written by Takahiro Yamada (musician)
2019 songs
Ki/oon Music singles
Anime songs